The Cape Verde swift or Alexander's swift (Apus alexandri) is a small bird of the swift family found only in the Cape Verde Islands. It has been recorded from all the islands except Santa Luzia although it probably breeds only on Santiago, Fogo, Brava, Santo Antão and São Nicolau. It is generally common with a stable population and is not considered to be threatened. The name Alexander's swift commemorates Boyd Alexander, an English ornithologist who led two expeditions to the islands in 1897.

Description
It is 13 cm long with a wingspan of 34 to 35 cm. The plumage is dark grey-brown with a large pale throat-patch. Compared to other swifts recorded from the islands it is smaller with shorter wings and a shallower fork to the tail. Its flight action is weaker and more fluttering. It has a high-pitched, screaming call with a buzzing quality.

Ecology
The Cape Verde swift feeds on insects which it catches while flying. It can be seen flying over all habitats and hunts in flight for insects, foraging in flocks over gullies and along cliffs and shorelines. The nest is built in a crevice in a cliff, in a cave or in the roof of a building. It is saucer-shaped and made of grass and feathers. The eggs are white and a clutch size of two has been reported. The bird is thought to be resident rather than migratory.

Status
The Cape Verde swift has a restricted range but is a common bird on the archipelago, with large numbers on Fogo and Brava. There is no evidence that its numbers are declining and no specific threats have been recognised, so the International Union for Conservation of Nature has assessed its conservation status as being of "least concern".

References

Clarke, Tony; Orgill, Chris & Dudley, Tony (2006) Field Guide to the Birds of the Atlantic Islands, Christopher Helm, London
Snow, D. W. & Perrins, C. M. (1998) Birds of the Western Palearctic: Concise Edition, Vol. 1, Oxford University Press.

External links

Mike Danzenbaker's Cape Verde Swift (Apus alexandri) Photo Page

Apus (genus)
Endemic birds of Cape Verde
Birds described in 1901